KKQY is a radio station airing a country music format licensed to Hill City, Kansas, broadcasting on 101.9 MHz FM.  The station serves the Hays, Kansas area, and is owned by Eagle Communications, Inc.

References

External links

Country radio stations in the United States
KQY